The Leszynski naming convention (or LNC) is a variant of Hungarian notation popularized by consultant Stan Leszynski specifically for use with Microsoft Access development. Although the naming convention is nowadays often used within the Microsoft Access community, and is the standard in Visual Basic programming, it is not widely used elsewhere.

The conventions are derived from an earlier set of conventions, the Leszynski/Reddick naming conventions, originally developed in 1992 by Greg Reddick. Eventually, Leszynski and Reddick had different ideas about how the conventions should be developed, and split into two separate sets of conventions, the other being the RVBA Conventions.

As in all Hungarian notations, it uses prefixes (called tags) to indicate the type of objects and database development fields. The general structure of Hungarian notation (named after Charles Simonyi's native country) is to break down object names into the following elements:
[prefix(es)][tag]BaseName[Suffix/Qualifier]
The tags are lower case and the object name is camel case. Spaces and underscores are not used.

Advantages
Since the Leszynski naming convention is a special form of Hungarian notation the same general advantages also apply to the Leszynski convention.

The use of distinctive prefixes makes your database self-documenting; when you see frmSales in VBA code, you will know that it references a form, and when you see curSales you will know that it is a Currency variable.  When selecting a query from a drop-down list, you will know that a query starting with qmak is a make-table query, while one starting with quni is a union query.  This information will allow you to avoid errors such as using the SetFocus method (a control method) with a field, or trying to open a table.

Disadvantages
Since the Leszynski naming convention is a special form of Hungarian notation the same general disadvantages also apply to the Leszynski convention.
Changes in database design may require wholesale renaming. For example, replacing a table with a query would involve either retaining the tbl name for the query, or going through the entire database replacing the tbl name with a query name.
When transferring the database to a different DBMS, problems will arise if the target DBMS does not support CamelCase names.
As every object of the same type starts with the same letter, it is not possible to navigate through the objects in a List box by typing the beginning letter.

Elements
The elements of the naming convention are described in the following table.

The Basic LNC Object Prefixes

The Basic LNC Variable Prefixes

The Basic LNC Database Object Tags

The LNC Table Field Tags

The LNC Tags for VBA Variables

The LNC Tags for Form and Report Controls

Some Typical LNC Names for Database Objects, Controls and Variables

References
Part of this article is based on Helen Feddema's book, Expert One-on-One Microsoft Access Application Development, Wiley, .

External links
Leszynski Naming Conventions for Microsoft Solution Developers
LNC Renaming Add-in – A free Access add-in that automatically applies the LNC to an Access 2000, 2002 or 2003 database
RVBA Conventions

Source code
Naming conventions